Kim Mi-Ja (born August 21, 1967) is a South Korean sprint canoer who competed in the late 1980s. At the 1988 Summer Olympics in Seoul, she was eliminated in the semifinals of both the K-1 500 m and the K-4 500 m events.

External links
Sports-Reference.com profile

1967 births
Canoeists at the 1988 Summer Olympics
Living people
Olympic canoeists of South Korea
South Korean female canoeists